Universities and Colleges Christian Fellowship (UCCF; also UCCF: The Christian Unions) is a UK-based charity that was founded in 1928 as the Inter-Varsity Fellowship of Evangelical Unions.  UCCF's dual aims are:
To advance the evangelical Christian faith amongst students, graduates and former members of universities; and
To promote biblical scholarship and research.

To achieve its aims, UCCF undertakes three main areas of activity: 
Encouraging and supporting leaders of affiliated Christian Unions (CUs) throughout the UK to engage in evangelism and help Christian students grow in their faith.
Publishing and distributing a wide range of Christian resources through its Inter-Varsity Press (IVP) subsidiary, based in Nottingham (not to be confused with the US-based InterVarsity Press).
Supporting biblical research, mostly at postgraduate level.

There are around 200 Christian Unions in the UK at present, with a total membership of approximately 20,000. The Christian Unions provide opportunities for fellowship, bible study and evangelism, with nearly 40,000 students attending outreach events each year.

UCCF employs about 80 staff, and has a further 80 or so volunteer "Relay Workers" on a one-year training programme. Many of these staff and volunteers are graduates who were involved in the CU as undergraduates. They support the student Christian Unions with training, advice and materials.

History
In the summer term of 1919 Norman Grubb (an evangelical student at Trinity College, Cambridge) and a friend met with ten representatives of the Student Christian Movement (SCM) to discuss their concerns that SCM was promoting an overly liberal view of Christianity in the British universities. Grubb posed the direct question, "Does the Student Christian Movement put the atoning blood of Christ central in its teaching?" After a little deliberation the answer came, "Well, we acknowledge it, but not necessarily [as] central."

Grubb and his friends at Cambridge decided that they could no longer work in partnership with SCM, saying that it had divorced a biblically-based, cross-centred emphasis.  Cambridge Inter-Collegiate Christian Union (CICCU) had been disaffiliated from national SCM since 1910, but only after talks in 1919 floundered did a permanent split look probable. Splits followed throughout the British and Irish university system, and two separate organisations emerged which went on to form the modern UCCF (initially known as the IVF) and SCM.

CICCU parted from SCM over two issues. For Grubb and his friends, the Bible had to be the central source of truth, but SCM could not affirm that its entire membership matched their view of Biblical infallibility. The second area of difference was the priority of evangelism; although the SCM had initially aimed at "the evangelisation of the world in this generation", CICCU members felt that this aim was not being sufficiently emphasised by 1922. SCM's official history also refers to differences over governance.

Grubb developed a vision of seeing an "evangelical witnessing community on every university campus". (At the time just 28 universities operated in the UK and Ireland.)

Meanwhile, in 1919, students from Oxford, Cambridge and London CUs started to meet in London for non-residential conferences.  After being persuaded to take on the secretaryship of these Inter-Varsity Conferences in 1924, King's College alumnus Dr Douglas Johnson was chosen by delegates from the 14 university Christian unions who assembled at High Leigh Conference Centre, Hoddesdon in 1928 to found the Inter-Varsity Fellowship of Evangelical Unions (IVF) as its first General Secretary, a role in which he continued until 1964. The Inter-Varsity Fellowship was the first unifying conservative evangelical body.

In 1947 UCCF became a founding member of the International Fellowship of Evangelical Students (IFES), through which it continues to play an active role in international mission.

During the 1940s, CU work began in the Technical Colleges under a subsidiary body, the Inter-Colleges Christian Fellowship (ICCF), and this saw substantial growth with the formation of polytechnics, as a consequence of the increase in full-time students in that sector. Alongside this, the Colleges of Education Christian Unions (CECU) provided a similar function, supporting Christian Unions based in teacher-training colleges.  Work in these areas expanded rapidly in the late 1960s and early 1970s, such that by the mid-1970s it represented half the ministry, and resulted in ICCF and CECU merging with IVF to form the Universities and Colleges Christian Fellowship. A specialist group, the Religious and Theological Students Fellowship (RTSF), who published the journal Themelios, retained a separate identity.

Since then many colleges have themselves gained university status. Until 2007 UCCF continued to serve both the HE and FE sectors of tertiary education, but in that year a new organisation called FESTIVE – FE & Sixth Form Initiative came into being,
leaving UCCF free to concentrate on HE.

Key staff
 Douglas Johnson, Secretary, 1928–64
 Oliver R. Barclay, General Secretary, 1964–80
 Robin Wells, General Secretary, 1980–92
 Bob Horn, General Secretary, 1992–2001
 Richard Cunningham, Director, 2004–2022 (Suspended pending an investigation)

Research
UCCF supports biblical research through Tyndale House, Cambridge, which was founded in 1944.

From the late 1980s and into this century, support for those involved in Christian Ethics was provided through the Whitefield Institute, Oxford, founded by E. David Cook. In summer 2006 this was reconstituted to become the Kirby Laing Institute for Christian Ethics.

Objectives
The charity's main annual objectives in 2008 (a typical year, showing advances in some areas and consolidation of existing activity in others) were reported as being:

Doctrinal basis
The UCCF is rooted in conservative evangelical Christianity. For UCCF, Doctrinal Basis sets out the "fundamental truths of Christianity, as revealed in Holy Scripture," as follows:
There is one God in three persons, the Father, the Son and the Holy Spirit.
God is sovereign in creation, revelation, redemption and final judgement.
The Bible, as originally given, is the inspired and infallible Word of God. It is the supreme authority in all matters of belief and behaviour.
Since the fall, the whole of humankind is sinful and guilty, so that everyone is subject to God's wrath and condemnation.
The Lord Jesus Christ, God's incarnate Son, is fully God; he was born of a virgin; his humanity is real and sinless; he died on the cross, was raised bodily from death and is now reigning over heaven and earth.
Sinful human beings are redeemed from the guilt, penalty and power of sin only through the sacrificial death once and for all time of their representative and substitute, Jesus Christ, the only mediator between them and God.
Those who believe in Christ are pardoned all their sins and accepted in God's sight only because of the righteousness of Christ credited to them; this justification is God's act of undeserved mercy, received solely by trust in him and not by their own efforts.
The Holy Spirit alone makes the work of Christ effective to individual sinners, enabling them to turn to God from their sin and to trust in Jesus Christ.
The Holy Spirit lives in all those he has regenerated. He makes them increasingly Christlike in character and behaviour and gives them power for their witness in the world.
The one holy universal church is the Body of Christ, to which all true believers belong.
The Lord Jesus Christ will return in person, to judge everyone, to execute God's just condemnation on those who have not repented and to receive the redeemed to eternal glory.

Some Christians (including, but not limited to, many members of non-Protestant groups such as the Roman Catholic and Eastern Orthodox Churches) do not hold to certain points of the Doctrinal Basis. In particular the doctrines of sola scriptura (point 3 above) and penal substitution (point 6) are contested by some Christian theologians, and nontrinitarians contest part 1. In some cases, UCCF's evangelical theology has led to Christian Unions having difficult relationships with Chaplaincies and/or Student Unions. It is also a substantial and persistent difference between UCCF and SCM (which is committed to ecumenism, including co-operation with CUs).

See also
International Fellowship of Evangelical Students
Inter-Varsity Press

Members
List of Christian Unions in Great Britain, mostly affiliated to UCCF
Cambridge Inter-Collegiate Christian Union
Oxford Inter-Collegiate Christian Union
Durham Inter-Collegiate Christian Union

International sister organisations
InterVarsity Christian Fellowship (USA)
Inter-Varsity Christian Fellowship of Canada
Australian Fellowship of Evangelical Students
Tertiary Students Christian Fellowship (New Zealand)

Other UK student Christian movements
Student Christian Movement of the United Kingdom

References

Bibliography

Douglas Johnson, Contending for the Faith – A History of the Evangelical Movement in the Universities and Colleges. .
Steve Bruce, The Student Christian Movement and the Inter-Varsity Fellowship: a sociological study of two student movements, (unpublished PhD thesis) – A copy is held at the British Library and also at the Center for Research Libraries, Chicago, IL 60637. An online PDF is also available.
Lindsay Brown, Shining like Stars – stories from students worldwide. 
Oliver Barclay & Robern Horn, From Cambridge to the World – history of Cambridge CU. 
Steve Bruce, The Student Christian Movement and the Inter-Varsity Fellowship (unpublished PhD thesis), cited in Notes from a second class convert: How Leith Samuel became a Christian, Evangelicals Now, July 1998

External links
UCCF official website
UCCF's apologetics website
UCCF's theology website
FE and Sixth Form Initiative

Christian student societies in the United Kingdom
Evangelical parachurch organizations
Christian organizations established in 1928
Christian organizations established in the 20th century
Christian organisations based in the United Kingdom
Organisations based in Oxford
Christianity in Oxford